John Bernard Riley (born June 11, 1954, Aberdeen, Maryland) is an American jazz drummer and educator. He has performed with Woody Herman, Stan Getz, Milt Jackson, Miles Davis, Dizzy Gillespie, John Scofield, Bob Mintzer, Gary Peacock, Mike Stern, Joe Lovano, Franck Amsallem, the Vanguard Jazz Orchestra, the Carnegie Hall Jazz Band, John Patitucci, and Bob Berg.

Life

Early education
Riley began playing drums at age eight, after receiving a snare drum as a gift.  In the biographies provided to the media, Riley acknowledges the early support of his parents, John and Mary Ann.  While attending fourth grade in Scotch Plains, New Jersey, Riley began studying percussion privately with Thomas Sicola, Jr. (b. Mar. 1944), who, at that time, was a recent graduate of the New York College of Music (bachelor of music) and a music teacher in the nearby Cranford Township Public Schools.

While studying with Sicola, Riley gained control of the snare drum through work on the rudiments ("beats of the day"), reading, and coordination — both in the classical and jazz idioms.  Sicola trained John on a variety of traditional percussion instruments, including xylophone, timpani, and drum kit. At age twelve, Riley began playing in rock bands and heard his first jazz recordings:  (i) the soundtrack to The Gene Krupa Story and (ii) Max Roach's Conversation. Two years later, he played his first professional gig, which he obtained through an audition played over the telephone. Riley began studying with Joe Morello in 1971 after meeting him at a drum symposium.

Riley graduated from Scotch Plains-Fanwood High School in 1971 and enrolled at the University of North Texas.

Sicola has since retired and is now is a Deacon at Our Lady of the Mount Roman Catholic Church in Warren, New Jersey.

College
Riley studied music at the University of North Texas College of Music, where he was introduced to a larger world of music and percussion. While there, he played, toured, and recorded Lab 76 with the One O'Clock Lab Band.  Lab 76 was nominated for a Grammy Award for "Best Jazz Performance by a Big Band."  Jazz drummer Paul Guerrero had been one of his influential teachers at North Texas.

New York
Riley moved to New York City in September 1976 and in 1978 became a member of Woody Herman Band. Following that experience, John began freelancing with a wide spectrum of world-class musicians including Stan Getz, Milt Jackson, Miles Davis, Dizzy Gillespie, John Scofield, Bob Mintzer, Gary Peacock, Mike Stern, Joe Lovano, the Vanguard Jazz Orchestra, the Carnegie Hall Jazz Band, John Patitucci, Bob Berg, and many others.  Riley had been subbing for Mel Lewis in the Mel Lewis Jazz Orchestra.  When Lewis died in 1990, the orchestra decided to continue as the Vanguard Jazz Orchestra and Riley became its permanent drummer, a chair he has held for  years.

Discography

With Bob Mintzer
 Spectrum (DMP, 1987)
 Techno Pop (Jazz Door, 1987)
 Art of the Big Band (DMP, 1991)
 Departure (DMP, 1993)
 Only in New York (DMP, 1994)
 The First Decade (DMP, 1995)
 Big Band Trane (DMP, 1996)
 Latin from Manhattan (DMP, 1998)
 Homage to Count Basie (DMP, 2000)
 Live at MCG (MCG Jazz, 2004)
 Old School, New Lessons (MCG Jazz, 2006)

With Bobby Paunetto
 Composer in Public (RSVP, 1996)
 Reconstituted (RSVP, 2000)

With DMP Big Band
 Carved in Stone (DMP, 1995)
 DMP Big Band Salutes Duke Ellington (DMP, 1997)

With Eijiro Nakagawa and Jim Pugh
 Legend and Lion (Superkids, 2003)
 E2'n J2 (TNC, 2005)

With George Gruntz
 Liebermann Live in Berlin (TCB, 1999)
 Merryteria (TCB, 1999)
 Expo Triangle (MGB, 2000)
 News Reel Matters (2015)

With Hubert Nuss
 The Shimmering Colours of Stained Glass, (GreenHouse, 1997)
 The Underwater Poet (Greenhouse, 2002)
 Feed the Birds (Pirouet, 2005)

With Luis Bonilla
 I Talking Now (Planet Arts, 2009)
 Twilight (Planet Arts)

With Mike Metheny
 Blue Jay Sessions (Headfirst, 1981)
 Kaleidoscope (MCA, 1988)

With Vanguard Jazz Orchestra
 Lickety Split (New World, 1997)
 Thad Jones Legacy (New World, 1999)
 Can I Persuade You? (Planet Arts, 2001)
 The Way, (Planet Arts, 2004)
 Up from the Skies (Planet Arts, 2006)
 Monday Night Live at the Village Vanguard (Planet Arts, 2008)
 Forever Lasting, Live in Tokyo (Planet Arts, 2010)

With others
 University of North Texas: Lab 76 (UNT Jazz, 1976)
 Woody Herman: The Woody Herman Orchestra (JazzDoor, 1978)
 Harris Simon Group, Swish (East Wind, 1980)
 Richard Boukas: Embarcadero (Jazz Essence, 1983)
 Richard Lacona: Painter of Dreams (Morningside, 1984)
 Mike Carubia: Renaissance (KamaDisc, 1985)
 Greg Hyslop: Manhattan Date (Slope, 1986)
 Richard Lacona (The Bad Little Big Band): A Long Way To Go (Morningside, 1986) 
 Mark Soskin: Overjoyed (JazzCity, 1987)
 Red Rodney Quintet: Red Snapper and One for Bird (SteepleChase, 1988)
 Haze Greenfield: Five for the City (Owl Time Line, 1989)
 John Scofield: Live Three Ways (Blue Note Video, 1990)
 Kenny Werner: Uncovered Heart (Sunnyside, 1990)
 John Hart: One Down (Blue Note, 1990)
 Miles Davis and Quincy Jones: Miles and Quincy Live at Montreux (Warner Bros., 1991)
 Bruce Williamson: Big City Magic Timeless, 1993)
 John Serry: Enchantress (Telarc, 1995)
 Claudio Angeleri: Jazz Files (CDPM-Lion, 1996)
 Joseph Allessi: New York Legends (Cala, 1996)
 Lalo Schifrin: Gillespiana (Aleph, 1996)
 Shigeko Suzuki: Brisa (BMG, 1996)
 Sigurdur Flosason: Sounds from Afar (Jazziz, 1996)
 Vince Mendoza and the WDR Big Band (de): Flame (Carlton, 1996)
 Michael Davis: Brass Nation (Hip-Bone, 2000)
 Ludwig Nuss: Ups and Downs (Mons, 2003)
 Todd Coolman: Perfect Strangers (ArtistShare, 2008)
 Randy Sandke: Jazz for Juniors (Arbors, 2009)
 Steve Hobbs: Vibes, Straight Up (Challenge, 2009)
 Daniel Jamieson's Danjam Orchestra: Sudden Appearance, (Origin, 2010)
 John Hyde Quartet: John Hyde Quartet (Death Defying, 2010)
 Nicolas Folmer: Off the Beaten Tracks, Vol. 1 (PID, 2010)
 Pavel Wlosok, Mike McGuirk, John Riley aka Wlosok/McGuirk/Riley Trio: Jubilee Suite: Live at the Grey Eagle, New Port Line, Prague (2012)
 Ralf Buschmeyer: Jazz Speak (2012)
 Dick Oatts/Mats Holmquist (sv) New York Jazz Orchestra: A Tribute to Herbie +1 (Summit 2015)

DVD
 John Scofield: Live Three Ways, Blue Note, 2005
 David Liebman: Teaches and Plays, Jamey Aebersold Jazz, 2005
 John Riley: The Master Drummer How to Play Practice and Think like a Pro, Alfred Music, 2009

Academic positions
 Faculty, Manhattan School of Music since 1986
Faculty, Kutztown University of Pennsylvania
Artist-in-residence, Amsterdam Conservatory

Publications
 Brazilian Rhythms for Drumset, (Book & CD), by Duduka da Fonseca and John Riley, Alfred Publishing (November 1, 1993) 
 The Art of Bop Drumming, Alfred Publishing (July 11, 1994) 
 Beyond Bop Drumming, Alfred Publishing (March 17, 1997) 
 The Jazz Drummer's Workshop, Modern Drummer (January 1, 2005) 
 The Master Drummer (DVD), Alfred Publishing (April 1, 2009)

See also
 List of drummers
 Manhattan School of Music
 Zildjian

References 
 drummerworld.com bio Drummerworld bio

External links
 John Riley official website
 Encyclopedia of Jazz Musicians: John Riley
 Drummer — The Greats: John Riley, Modern Drummer (magazine), November 2, 2010

American jazz drummers
Bebop drummers
Big band drummers
Mainstream jazz drummers
Swing drummers
Musicians from New York (state)
Manhattan School of Music faculty
State University of New York faculty
Manhattan School of Music alumni
University of North Texas College of Music alumni
Living people
1954 births
American jazz educators
People from Aberdeen, Maryland
20th-century American drummers
American male drummers
People from Scotch Plains, New Jersey
Scotch Plains-Fanwood High School alumni
Jazz musicians from Maryland
Jazz musicians from Texas
20th-century American male musicians
American male jazz musicians